CHFA-FM is a Canadian radio station, which broadcasts the programming of Radio-Canada's Ici Radio-Canada Première network in Edmonton, Alberta.

The station was launched in 1949 by a local non-profit consortium to bring French radio service to Edmonton, and was directly acquired by the network in 1974.

The station serves the entire province of Alberta from its studios in Edmonton, although it also maintains a smaller bureau in Calgary. For most of its history, the station broadcast at 680 AM. On January 20, 2012, it was announced that Radio-Canada planned to close down CHFA's AM transmitter at 680, with its nested FM repeater in Edmonton, CHFA-10-FM at 101.1 MHz, swapping places with the much-stronger Espace musique station CBCX-FM-1 at 90.1 MHz. This application was approved by the Canadian Radio-television and Telecommunications Commission on June 22, 2012.

Programming
The station's current local programs are Le café show, in the mornings from 6:00 a.m. to 9 a.m. and La croisée in the afternoons, 3:30 p.m. to 6 p.m. The Saturday morning program, Culture et confiture, originates from CBUF-FM Vancouver. On holidays, CKSB-10-FM produces holiday morning program for western Canada, Les matins de l'Ouest. CHFA also produces Le retour de l'ouest who replaces regional drive programming on Première outlets in western Canada.

Rebroadcasters

On May 24, 2016, the CBC applied to add a new FM rebroadcaster at Jasper, Alberta. The new transmitter will operate at 101.1 MHz. The callsign for the new transmitter will be CHFA-FM-13.

On August 31, 2016, the CRTC approved the CBC's application to operate transmitters in Jasper at 101.1 MHz, Lake Louise at 102.7 MHz and Banff at 105.7 MHz that will rebroadcast the programming of its national French-language network service ICI Radio-Canada Première.

On December 12, 2017, the CBC received CRTC approval to change the authorized contours of the rebroadcasting transmitter CHFA-5-FM Grande Prairie, Alberta, by relocating the transmitter site, changing the frequency from 90.5 MHz (channel 213) to 103.3 MHz (channel 277) and the class from B to C1, and increasing the average effective radiated power from 5,000 to 25,300 watts and the effective height of the antenna above average terrain from 206.5 to 247.5 metres.

On November 20, 2020, the CBC applied to add a new FM rebroadcaster at Bonnyville, Alberta. The new transmitter will operate at 98.7 MHz to rebroadcast the programming of its national French-language network service ICI Radio-Canada Première. The callsign for the new transmitter will be CHFA-FM-14 and will replace CHFB-FM which is a privately owned community rebroadcasting facility l'Association Canadienne Française de l'Alberta. The CRTC approved the CBC's application on February 25, 2021.

References

External links
Ici Radio-Canada Première
CHFA history - Canadian Communications Foundation

Hfa
Hfa
Hfa
Franco-Albertan culture
Radio stations established in 1949
1949 establishments in Alberta